Gascony is a province of southwestern France.

Gascony may also refer to:

 Duchy of Gascony or Duchy of Vasconia, a duchy in the Middle Ages
 Landes of Gascony, or Landes de Gascogne, a natural region of France
 Cuisine of Gascony

See also
 
 Gascon (disambiguation)
 Gascogne (disambiguation)
 Gascoyne (disambiguation)

Language and nationality disambiguation pages